Cameraria sempervirensella is a moth of the family Gracillariidae. It is known from California, United States.

The length of the forewings is 3.5–5 mm.

The larvae feed on Chrysolepis sempervirens. They mine the leaves of their host plant. The mine is ovoid and the epidermis is opaque, tan. All mines cross the midrib and consume 70%-95% of the leaf surface. The mines are solitary and usually have two folds, but often one.

Etymology
The name of the species is derived from the specific name of its principle host, Chrysolepis sempervirens.

References

Cameraria (moth)
Moths described in 1981

Moths of North America
Lepidoptera of the United States
Leaf miners
Fauna of California
Taxa named by Donald R. Davis (entomologist)
Taxa named by Paul A. Opler